Robert J. McMahon is an American historian of the foreign relations of the United States and a scholar of the Cold War. He currently holds the chair of Ralph D. Mershon Distinguished Professor at Ohio State University.

Career 
McMahon received his B.A. from Fairfield University in 1971 and PhD from the University of Connecticut in 1977. He taught at the University of Florida from 1982 to 2005, when he moved to Ohio State University. He has held visiting positions at the University of Virginia and University College Dublin. McMahon holds a joint appointment with the Mershon Center for International Security Studies at OSU.

McMahon served as 2001 president of the Society for Historians of American Foreign Relations.

Works

Books 

 Editor.
 Co-editor with Thomas W. Zeiler

 Editor.

 Co-author with Thomas G. Paterson.

Articles and chapters

Reception

The Cold War on the Periphery: The United States, India, and Pakistan

Noel H Pugach from the University of New Mexico, in Pacific Historical Review, calls the book  an "excellent monograph" tracing the US-India-Pakistan relationship and a "solid and sound study". Pugach observes that McMahon has "exhaustively" researched primary sources from the United States and comments that the book will serve as a model reference point for studies of US-Third World relations during the Cold War.

According to Kenton J. Clymer from the University of Texas in The American Historical Review it is a "superb" study of the relations between the US, India and Pakistan, which makes use of the best available archival documents. Clymer calls it an excellent work which will be a "definitive account" of American policy in South Asia during the Cold War.

Richard Ned Lebow in The American Political Science Review calls it a "careful historical study" while Rafique Kawthari notes in Current History that the professor of history, Robert McMahon, has relied mainly on recently declassified documents and calls the historical study timely. Warren I. Cohen, from the University of Maryland's Department of History, states in Reviews in American History that Robert McMahon had already established himself as one of the best diplomatic historians and this "magnificent" book delivers "far more than its title promises". Cohen further comments that McMahon has written the best book on American relations with South Asia during the 1945-1965 period.

Notes

External links 
Robert J. McMahon Ohio State University Department of History
"Turning Point: the Vietnam War's Pivotal Years", McMahon's lecture for the OAH Distinguished Lectureship Program

21st-century American historians
21st-century American male writers
University of Florida faculty
Ohio State University faculty
Living people
Fairfield University alumni
University of Connecticut alumni
Year of birth missing (living people)
American male non-fiction writers